Santa Ana de Tusi District is one of eight districts of the province Daniel Alcides Carrión in Peru.

See also 
 Allqaqucha

References